Beaver Lake is a lake in the south-eastern portion of the Canadian province of Saskatchewan, just north of the community of Kenosee Lake in Moose Mountain Provincial Park.

The lake and park are on a plateau called Moose Mountain Upland in the prairie pothole region of Saskatchewan.

There's a 7.2-kilometre trail that goes around Beaver Lake called Beaver Lake and Youell Lake Trails.

See also 
List of lakes of Saskatchewan
List of protected areas of Saskatchewan

References

Lakes of Saskatchewan
Wawken No. 93, Saskatchewan
Division No. 1, Saskatchewan